The Hino da Independência (Portuguese for Independence Anthem) is a Brazilian official patriotic song commemorating the country's declaration of independence from Portugal. The anthem was composed in 1822 by Emperor Pedro I, the lead figure in the country's struggle for independence, and the lyrics were written by poet Evaristo da Veiga.

It is sung on September 7 each year in Brazil.

Lyrics 
Usually verses 3, 4, 5, 6, 8 and 10 (in italics) are nowadays omitted when the anthem of the Independence is sung.

References

External links 
MP3 file

National symbols of Brazil
Portuguese-language songs
Brazilian patriotic songs
Historical national anthems
Brazilian anthems